E. Dan Stevens (born May 2, 1943) was a member of the Michigan House of Representatives.

Early life
Stevens was born on May 2, 1943.

Career
On November 5, 1974, Stevens was elected to the Michigan House of Representatives where he represented the 106th district from January 8, 1975 to December 31, 1978. During his second term, Stevens served as the Vice-Chair of the Committee on Labor for the chamber. In 1994, was an unsuccessful candidate in the Democratic primary for the Michigan Senate seat representing the 34th district.

Personal life
During his time in the legislature, Stevens resided in Atlanta, Michigan.

References

Living people
1943 births
People from Montmorency County, Michigan
Democratic Party members of the Michigan House of Representatives
20th-century American politicians